Fulham is a district of London, England

Fulham can also refer to:

Places

London, England, UK
 Fulham, an historic Inner London district
 Fulham District (Metropolis), a former local government district
 Fulham (UK Parliament constituency), a former parliamentary constituency in London
 Hammersmith and Fulham (UK Parliament constituency), a former parliamentary constituency in London
 Chelsea and Fulham (UK Parliament constituency), Greater London
 Metropolitan Borough of Fulham, a former borough in London
 London Borough of Hammersmith and Fulham, a borough in London

Australia
 Fulham, Queensland, Australia; a rural locality
 Fulham, South Australia, Australia; a suburb of Adelaide
 Fulham Island, Tasmania, Australia
 Fulham homestead, Victoria, Australia

People
 Bishop of Fulham, Diocese of London, Church of England

 Edward Fulham (died 1694), Oxford professor
 George Fulham (1660–1702), English priest
 John Fulham (1699–1777), British cleric
 Rowena Fulham (née Nutira) (born 1960), New Zealand soccer player
 Thomas Fulham (1915–1995), U.S. businessman

Sports
 Fulham Irish GAA Club, a gaelic football and hurling club based in West London, UK 
 Fulham F.C., an English association football club based in Fulham, London, UK
 Fulham L.F.C.
 Fulham, the original name of the rugby league team now known as Harlequins RL.

Ships
 , a coastal tanker in service with J P Langford Shipping Ltd, Sharpness from 1966, renamed to Fulham in 1974.
 , the Fullham, a WWII Empire ship

See also

 
 Elizabeth Fulhame